Oberea fulviceps is a species of longhorn beetle in the tribe Saperdini in the genus Oberea, discovered by Breuning in 1950.

References

F
Beetles described in 1950